The 1981 FIVB Men's World Cup was held from 19 to 28 November 1981 in Japan. It was the 4th edition of the competition.

Qualification

Results
Source:

|}

Location: Fukuoka

|}

Location: Hiroshima and Matsuyama

|}

Location: Gifu

|}

Location: Tokyo

|}

Location: Yokohama

|}

Location: Tokyo

|}

Final standing

Awards

 Most Valuable Player
  Vyacheslav Zaytsev
 Best Spiker
  Raúl Vilches
 Best Blocker
  Aleksandr Borisovich Savin

 Best Setter
  Shen Fu Lin
 Best Defender
  Renan Dal Zotto
 Best on the pitch
  Haruhiko Hanawa

References

External links
 Results

FIVB Volleyball Men's World Cup
Men's World Cup